He is a dairyman and entrepreneur from Tamil Nadu. He is the Chairman of Hatsun Agro Product Ltd, the largest private sector dairy company in India. The company's well-known brands Arun, Arokya and Hatsun are leaders in the segments of ice creams, milk and curd amongst private dairies in India. He is one of the first generation of entrepreneurs from Thiruthangal, Sivakasi. He is one among the 100 India Billionaires, with a fortune of $2.5 billion.

He has a net worth of US$2.5 Billion. (As of March 2022)

Early life and career 
Chandramogan was born in Thiruthangal, Virudhunagar District, Tamil Nadu. He founded Arun Icecreams.

In an interview with Sify, he shared his interest in sports especially in playing badminton and has won the veteran's championship for two years. He also enjoys reading books.

References

External links 

moneycontrol.com

Businesspeople from Tamil Nadu
Tamil businesspeople
Living people
Food and drink in India
Businesspeople in the food industry
Year of birth missing (living people)